George Bosworth Churchill (October 24, 1866 – July 1, 1925) was an American politician, a Representative from Massachusetts, and an academic and editor.

Life and career
Churchill was born in Worcester, Massachusetts to Ezra and Myra Jane Churchill and grew up there. He graduated from Amherst College in 1889, where he was a member of the Chi Phi Fraternity. He taught at Worcester High School until 1892.  At this point he moved to Philadelphia and taught in the William Penn Charter School, simultaneously taking a postgraduate course at the University of Pennsylvania 1892-1894.

In 1894, he went to Europe and studied in the University of Strassburg, Germany (now in France), and then attended the University of Berlin, 1895-1897. He returned to the United States and became assistant editor of the Cosmopolitan Magazine in 1897 and 1898; member of the faculty of Amherst College 1898-1925 (as professor of English Literature); moderator of Amherst 1905-1925.

He was member of the State senate 1917-1919; delegate to the State constitutional conventions in 1917 and 1919; elected as a Republican to the Sixty-ninth Congress and served from March 4, 1925, until his death, in Amherst. He was buried in Wildwood Cemetery.

See also
 1917 Massachusetts legislature
 1918 Massachusetts legislature
 1919 Massachusetts legislature
List of United States Congress members who died in office (1900–49)

References

External links
 

 George Bosworth Churchill (AC 1889) Papers in the Amherst College Archives and Special Collections

1866 births
1925 deaths
Republican Party Massachusetts state senators
Politicians from Worcester, Massachusetts
Amherst College alumni
Amherst College faculty
University of Pennsylvania alumni
University of Strasbourg alumni
American magazine editors
Republican Party members of the United States House of Representatives from Massachusetts